The Clube Desportivo Estrela Vermelha, the Red Star Sports Club, is a sports club from Maputo, the capital of the south-east African state Mozambique. It was founded during the Portuguese colonial era on 4 October 1934 as Clube Desportivo Malhangalene, deriving its name from the historic quarter of the city. In this era the club was associated as filial with the motherland club FC Porto and carried from ca. 1960 forward the same emblem, except the initials FCP were replaced with CDM. After the independence of Mozambique the club was briefly renamed to Centro Popular de Maputo, a name the club retained until 1978.

History

During its history the club had substantial success in basketball and roller hockey. The basketball team won the Championship of Portugal in 1974, the last year in which clubs from Moçambique participated in this competition.

The roller hockey players won seven national championships: three from 1958 to 1960 and four consecutive titles from 1990 to 1993. In addition the team won the Portuguese Cup in 1964. Fernando Amaral Adrião (1939-2006), between 1958 and 1974 five times world champion, commenced his career with CD Malhangalene.

The football team has not yet won any major titles. Highlight hitherto has been the national cup final of 1986, which was lost to CD Maxaquene with 0-2. The ensuing campaign in the African Cup of Cup Winners ended in the first round with 0-1 and 0-3 defeats to Nchanga Rangers FC of Zambia.

Since the introduction of a unified national first division, the Moçambola, in 2000 the footballers of Estrela Vermelha played four seasons in the league, the sixth rank of 2007 being the highlight. Following the relegation after its first season in 2001 the club returned in 2006 to survive relegation play-offs thereafter. The last relegation followed after the 2008 season.

Honours 
Football
 Cup of Moçambique: finalist 1986

Basketball
 Championship of Portugal: 1974

Roller Hockey
 Championship of Moçambique: (7) 1958, 1959, 1960. 1990, 1991, 1992, 1993.
 Portuguese Cup: 1964

External links 
 The Delagoabay Company

Football clubs in Mozambique
Sport in Maputo
Sports clubs established in 1934
Sports teams in Mozambique